Mount Davis is a mountain in British Columbia, north-east of junction of Nicholson Creek and Kettle River and near Davis Lake.

References
 

Davisw
Similkameen Division Yale Land District